Andriy Nesteruk (born 1 August 1978) is a retired Ukrainian football striker.

References

1978 births
Living people
Sportspeople from Ivano-Frankivsk
Ukrainian footballers
FC Prykarpattia Ivano-Frankivsk (2004) players
FC Khutrovyk Tysmenytsia players
FC Kalush players
FC Sheriff Tiraspol players
FC Politehnica Chișinău players
FC Tiraspol players
FC Stal Alchevsk players
SC Tavriya Simferopol players
FC Hoverla Uzhhorod players
FC Ordabasy players
Association football forwards
Ukrainian expatriate footballers
Expatriate footballers in Moldova
Ukrainian expatriate sportspeople in Moldova
Expatriate footballers in Kazakhstan
Ukrainian expatriate sportspeople in Kazakhstan
FC Kalush managers
FC Karpaty Halych managers
Ukrainian football managers